House of Artists is a building in Tsentralny City District of Novosibirsk, Russia. It is located on Romanov Street. The house was built in the 1930s. Architects: B. A. Gordeyev, S. P. Turgenev.

Location
The building is located in a city block between Krasny Avenue and Romanov, Frunze, Michurin streets.

Gallery

Notable residents
 Ivan Sollertinsky (1902–1944), a Russian polymath of the Soviet period. He lived in the house from 1941 to 1944.

See also
 Polyclinic No. 1
 Aeroflot House
 Gosbank Building
 Soyuzzoloto House

References

Tsentralny City District, Novosibirsk
Buildings and structures in Novosibirsk
Buildings and structures completed in the 1930s
Cultural heritage monuments of regional significance in Novosibirsk Oblast